JANAF may mean:

 Jadranski naftovod, an oil company and an oil pipeline in Croatia
 JANAF Shopping Center, a shopping center in Norfolk, Virginia
 Joint Army-Navy-Air Force, predecessor of the Joint Army-Navy-NASA-Air Force (JANNAF), an exchange platform for research between U.S. military institutions